An informational autocracy, also called a spin dictatorship, is a state that uses censorship and propaganda, rather than violent coercion or vote-rigging, to remain in power. The concept was proposed by Sergei Guriev and Daniel Treisman in a 2020 paper. An informational autocracy does not use violence or direct repression on its political opponents. It also creates its own institutions that mimic democratic institutions. The final characteristic of these regimes is that they have little support with the educated elite, but have wide support among the less-educated masses.

References 

Authoritarianism
Dictatorship